Horská Kvilda is a municipality and village in Klatovy District in the Plzeň Region of the Czech Republic. It has about 70 inhabitants.

Administrative parts
The hamlet of Korýtko is an administrative part of Horská Kvilda.

References

Villages in Klatovy District
Bohemian Forest